This is a list of casinos in the United States Virgin Islands.

List of casinos

See also

List of casinos in the United States 
Tourism in the United States Virgin Islands

References

External links

Casinos
United States Virgin Islands